Wazir Muhammad Saleem is a Pakistani politician who is member-elect of the Gilgit Baltistan Assembly.

Political career
Saleem contested 2020 Gilgit-Baltistan Assembly election on 15 November 2020 from constituency GBA-9 (Skardu-III) as an Independent candidate. He won the election by the margin of 1,099 votes over the runner up Fida Muhammad Nashad of Pakistan Tehreek-e-Insaf (PTI). He garnered 6,286 votes while Nashad received 5,187 votes. After winning the election, Saleem joined PTI.

References

Living people
Gilgit-Baltistan MLAs 2020–2025
Politicians from Gilgit-Baltistan
Year of birth missing (living people)